Edwin M. Durso is the executive vice president/administration of ESPN, Inc.

He has helped to build ESPN since 1989. He attended Harvard and played shortstop on the baseball team.  He graduated in 1975, cum laude. In 1978, Durso received his law degree with honors from the George Washington University Law School.

References

External links

American television executives
Living people
Year of birth missing (living people)
ESPN executives
Harvard Crimson baseball players
George Washington University Law School alumni